Márton Fucsovics was the defending champion. Australian Alex Bolt won his first Challenger title, with a 6–2, 7–5 defeat of Nikola Metkić in the final.

Seeds

Draw

Finals

Top half

Bottom half

References
 Main Draw
 Qualifying Draw

ATP China International Tennis Challengeandnbsp;- Singles
2014 Singles